Stenoptilia dubatolovi is a moth of the family Pterophoridae. It is found in Turkmenistan.

References

Moths described in 2001
dubatolovi
Moths of Asia